In Greek mythology, Agasthenes (Ancient Greek: Ἀγασθένης) was the son of Augeas, and his successor in the kingdom of Elis. The government was shared between Amphimachus, Thalpius and Agasthenes. With Peloris, he was the father of Polyxenus, one of the "suitors of Helen", who reunified the kingdom when he returned from Troy.

See also 
 Asteroid 13185 Agasthenes, named after the Greek hero

Notes

References 

Homer, The Iliad with an English Translation by A.T. Murray, Ph.D. in two volumes. Cambridge, MA., Harvard University Press; London, William Heinemann, Ltd. 1924. Online version at the Perseus Digital Library.
Homer. Homeri Opera in five volumes. Oxford, Oxford University Press. 1920. Greek text available at the Perseus Digital Library.
Hyginus, Fabulae from The Myths of Hyginus translated and edited by Mary Grant. University of Kansas Publications in Humanistic Studies. Online version at the Topos Text Project.
Pausanias, Description of Greece with an English Translation by W.H.S. Jones, Litt.D., and H.A. Ormerod, M.A., in 4 Volumes. Cambridge, MA, Harvard University Press; London, William Heinemann Ltd. 1918. Online version at the Perseus Digital Library
Pausanias, Graeciae Descriptio. 3 vols. Leipzig, Teubner. 1903. Greek text available at the Perseus Digital Library.
Kings of Elis
Kings in Greek mythology
Family of Calyce

Elean characters in Greek mythology